The 34th Film Independent Spirit Awards, honoring the best independent films of 2018, were presented by Film Independent on February 23, 2019. The nominations were announced on November 16, 2018 by actresses Molly Shannon and Gemma Chan. The ceremony was televised in the United States by IFC, taking place inside its usual tent setting on a beach in Santa Monica, California. It was hosted by Aubrey Plaza.

Winners and nominees

{| class=wikitable style="width=100%"
|-
!style="width=50%" | Best Feature
!style="width=50%" | Best Director
|-
| valign="top" |
If Beale Street Could Talk
 Eighth Grade 
 First Reformed
 Leave No Trace
 You Were Never Really Here
| valign="top" |
Barry Jenkins – If Beale Street Could Talk
 Debra Granik – Leave No Trace
 Tamara Jenkins – Private Life
 Lynne Ramsay – You Were Never Really Here
 Paul Schrader – First Reformed
|-
!style="width=50%" | Best Male Lead
!style="width=50%" | Best Female Lead
|-
| valign="top" |
Ethan Hawke – First Reformed as Pastor Ernst Toller
 John Cho – Searching as David Kim
 Daveed Diggs – Blindspotting as Collin Hoskins
 Christian Malheiros – Sócrates as Sócrates
 Joaquin Phoenix – You Were Never Really Here as Joe
| valign="top" |
Glenn Close – The Wife as Joan Castleman
 Toni Collette – Hereditary as Annie Graham
 Elsie Fisher – Eighth Grade as Kayla Day
 Regina Hall – Support the Girls as Lisa Conroy
 Helena Howard – Madeline's Madeline as Madeline
 Carey Mulligan – Wildlife as Jeanette Brinson
|-
!style="width=50%" | Best Supporting Male
!style="width=50%" | Best Supporting Female
|-
| valign="top" |
Richard E. Grant – Can You Ever Forgive Me? as Jack Hock
 Raúl Castillo – We the Animals as Paps
 Adam Driver – BlacKkKlansman as Detective Philip "Flip" Zimmerman
 Josh Hamilton – Eighth Grade as Mark Day
 John David Washington – Monsters and Men as Dennis Williams
| valign="top" |
Regina King – If Beale Street Could Talk as Sharon Rivers
 Kayli Carter – Private Life as Sadie Barrett
 Tyne Daly – A Bread Factory as Dorothea
 Thomasin McKenzie – Leave No Trace as Tom
 J. Smith-Cameron – Nancy as Ellen Lynch
|-
|-
!style="width=50%" | Best Screenplay
!style="width=50%" | Best First Screenplay
|-
| valign="top" |
Nicole Holofcener and Jeff Whitty – Can You Ever Forgive Me?
 Richard Glatzer, Rebecca Lenkiewicz, and Wash Westmoreland – Colette
 Tamara Jenkins – Private Life
 Boots Riley – Sorry to Bother You
 Paul Schrader – First Reformed
| valign="top" |
Bo Burnham – Eighth Grade
 Christina Choe – Nancy
 Cory Finley – Thoroughbreds
 Jennifer Fox – The Tale
 Laurie Shephard and Quinn Shephard – Blame
|-
!style="width=50%" | Best First Feature
!style="width=50%" | Best Documentary Feature
|-
| valign="top" |
Boots Riley – Sorry to Bother You
 Ari Aster – Hereditary
 Paul Dano – Wildlife
 Jennifer Fox – The Tale
 Jeremiah Zagar – We the Animals
| valign="top" |
Won't You Be My Neighbor?
 Hale County This Morning, This Evening
 Minding the Gap
 Of Fathers and Sons
 On Her Shoulders
 Shirkers
|-
!style="width=50%" | Best Cinematography
!style="width=50%" | Best Editing
|-
| valign="top" |
Sayombhu Mukdeeprom – Suspiria
 Ashley Connor – Madeline's Madeline
 Diego García – Wildlife
 Benjamin Loeb – Mandy
 Zak Mulligan – We the Animals
| valign="top" |
Joe Bini – You Were Never Really Here
 Keiko Deguchi, Brian A. Kates, and Jeremiah Zagar – We the Animals
 Luke Dunkley, Nick Fenton, Chris Gill, and Julian Hart – American Animals
 Anne Fabini, Alex Hall, and Gary Levy – The Tale
 Nick Houy – Mid90s
|-
! colspan="2" style="width=50%" | Best International Film
|-
| colspan="2" valign="top" |
Roma Burning
 The Favourite
 Happy as Lazzaro
 Shoplifters
|}

Films with multiple nominations and awards

Special awards

John Cassavetes AwardEn el séptimo día
 A Bread Factory
 Never Goin' Back
 Sócrates
 Thunder Road

Robert Altman Award (Best Ensemble)
(The award is given to its film director, casting director, and ensemble cast)

 Suspiria

Kiehl's Someone to Watch Award
Recognizes a talented filmmaker of singular vision who has not yet received appropriate recognition. The award includes a $25,000 unrestricted grant funded by Kiehl's.

 Alex Moratto – Sócrates
 Ioana Uricaru – Lemonade
 Jeremiah Zagar – We the Animals

The BONNIE Award
Recognizes mid-career women directors with a body of work that demonstrates uniqueness of vision and a groundbreaking approach to film making. The award includes a $50,000 unrestricted grant funded by American Airlines.

 Debra Granik
 Tamara Jenkins
 Karyn Kusama

Piaget Producers Award
Honors emerging producers who, despite highly limited resources, demonstrate the creativity, tenacity and vision required to produce quality, independent films. The award includes a $25,000 unrestricted grant funded by Piaget.

 Shrihari Sathe
 Jonathan Duffy and Kelly Williams
 Gabrielle Nadig

Truer than Fiction Award
Presented to an emerging director of non-fiction features who has not yet received significant recognition. The award includes a $25,000 unrestricted grant.

 Bing Liu – Minding the Gap
Alexandria Bombach – On Her Shoulders
 RaMell Ross – Hale County This Morning, This Evening

See also
 91st Academy Awards
 76th Golden Globe Awards
 72nd British Academy Film Awards
 39th Golden Raspberry Awards
 25th Screen Actors Guild Awards
 24th Critics' Choice Awards

References

External links
 

2018
Independent Spirit Awards
Independent Spirit Awards